Isoeugenol synthase (IGS1, t-anol/isoeugenol synthase 1) is an enzyme with systematic name eugenol:NADP+ oxidoreductase (coniferyl acetate reducing). This enzyme catalyses the following chemical reaction.

 isoeugenol + acetate + NADP+  coniferyl acetate + NADPH + H+

The enzyme acts in the reverse direction.

References

External links 
 

EC 1.1.1